A financier (formerly known as a visitandine) is a small French almond cake, flavoured with beurre noisette, usually baked in a small mold. Light and moist with a crisp, eggshell-like exterior, the traditional financier also contains egg whites, flour, and powdered sugar. The molds are usually small rectangular loaves similar in size to petits fours.

History 
The financier originates from Lorraine (French region). Originally made by the Visitandine order of nuns in the 17th century, the financier was popularized in the 19th century.

The name financier is said to derive from the traditional rectangular mold, which resembles a bar of gold when the Swiss reinterpreted the financier and baked it in this form. Some French bakeries still sell this cake under the name of 'visitandine'.

According to another tradition, the cake became popular in the financial district of Paris surrounding the Paris stock exchange, as the cake could easily be stored in the pocket for long periods without being damaged.

References

Further reading

Gisslen, Wayne. 2008. "Professional Baking", John Wiley & Sons, Hoboken, New Jersey. 
Merceron, Julien. 2014. "A la Mere de Famille: Recipes from the Beloved Parisian Confectioner", Chronicle Books, San Francisco, California. 
The Chefs of Le Cordon Bleu. 2012. "Pâtisserie and Baking Foundations - Classic Recipes", Delmar Cengage Learning, Boston, Massachusetts. 
Valette, Murielle. 2013. "Patisserie: A Step-by-step Guide to Baking French Pastries at Home", Constable & Robinson, London, U.K. 
Wells, Patricia. 1999. "The Food Lover's Guide to Paris", Workman Pub., New York City, New York. 

French cakes
Almond desserts